The 2014–15 Biathlon World Cup – World Cup 3 was held in Pokljuka, Slovenia, from 18 December until 21 December 2014.

Schedule of events

Medal winners

Men

Women

Achievements

 Best performance for all time

 , 8th place in Sprint
 , 21st place in Sprint
 , 46th place in Sprint
 , 82nd place in Sprint
 , 15th place in Pursuit
 , 57th place in Pursuit
 , 2nd place in Sprint
 , 4th place in Sprint
 , 8th place in Sprint
 , 12th place in Sprint
 , 14th place in Sprint
 , 17th place in Sprint
 , 29th place in Sprint
 , 55th place in Sprint
 , 58th place in Sprint
 , 62nd place in Sprint
 , 74th place in Sprint

 First World Cup race

 , 46th place in Sprint

References 

3
2014 in Slovenian sport
World Cup - World Cup 3,2014-15
Biathlon World Cup 3